James Hepburn Campbell (February 8, 1820 – April 12, 1895) was an Opposition Party and Republican member of the U.S. House of Representatives from Pennsylvania.

Biography
James Hepburn Campbell was born in Williamsport, Pennsylvania.  He graduated from the law department of Dickinson College in Carlisle, Pennsylvania, in 1841.  He was admitted to the bar the same year and commenced practice in Pottsville, Pennsylvania.  In 1842, he married author Juliet Hamersley Lewis, the daughter of Judge Ellis Lewis, Pennsylvania Attorney General and Chief Justice of the Pennsylvania Supreme Court.  Campbell was a delegate to the 1844 Whig National Convention.

Campbell was elected as an Opposition Party candidate to the Thirty-fourth Congress.  He was an unsuccessful candidate for reelection in 1856 to the Thirty-fifth Congress.  He was again elected as a Republican to the Thirty-sixth and Thirty-seventh Congresses.  He was not a candidate for renomination in 1862.

During the American Civil War, Campbell served as major of the Twenty-fifth Regiment of Pennsylvania Infantry.  He was appointed Minister to Sweden by President Abraham Lincoln in May 1864 and served until March 29, 1867.  He declined the diplomatic mission to Colombia in 1867.  He located in Philadelphia in 1867 and continued the practice of law.  He died on his estate "Aeola," near Wayne, Pennsylvania, in 1895.  He was interred in Woodlands Cemetery in Philadelphia.

See also

References
 Retrieved on 2008-02-14
The Political Graveyard

 James H. Campbell Papers, 1861-1866, William L. Clements Library, University of Michigan

1820 births
1895 deaths
Burials at The Woodlands Cemetery
Politicians from Williamsport, Pennsylvania
Opposition Party members of the United States House of Representatives from Pennsylvania
Republican Party members of the United States House of Representatives from Pennsylvania
Ambassadors of the United States to Sweden
Pennsylvania lawyers
People from Delaware County, Pennsylvania
Politicians from Pottsville, Pennsylvania
Union Army officers
19th-century American diplomats
19th-century American politicians
19th-century American lawyers
Military personnel from Pennsylvania